Michael James Efevberha (born August 22, 1984) is a Nigerian-American professional basketball player for Taoyuan Leopards of the T1 League. He played college basketball for the University of California, Irvine and California State University, Northridge. He has also represented the Nigeria national basketball team, serving as team captain in 2009 at the 2009 FIBA Africa Championship where he averaged 17.4 points, 4.1 rebounds and 2.0 assists per game.

In 2009, Efevberha was named New Zealand NBL Most Outstanding Guard and earned the league's scoring title with 27.8 points per game. He scored over 30 points in a game eight times and reached over the 40-point mark on two occasions. He led the Wellington Saints to the semi-finals, where they were defeated by the Nelson Giants.

On November 18, 2017, Efevberha signed with the Israeli team Bnei Herzliya for the 2017–18 season. However, on December 27, 2017, Efevberha parted ways with Herzliya after appearing in 4 games. On February 12, 2018, Efevberha signed with the Lebanese team Beirut Club
, and after losing at the semis versus Riyadi Beirut, Mike signed with Homenetmen Beirut for the 2018–2019 season, Mike signed with sagesse club for the 2019–2020.

On November 21, 2019, he has signed with JA Vichy-Clermont Métropole of the French Pro B. 

On November 25, 2022, Efevberha has signed with Taoyuan Leopards of the T1 League.

References

External links
NBA D-League profile

1984 births
Living people
American expatriate basketball people in China
American expatriate basketball people in the Czech Republic
American expatriate basketball people in the Dominican Republic
American expatriate basketball people in Lebanon
American expatriate basketball people in New Zealand
American expatriate basketball people in Russia
American expatriate basketball people in South Korea
American expatriate basketball people in Switzerland
American men's basketball players
American sportspeople of Nigerian descent
Anaheim Arsenal players
Anyang KGC players
Basketball players from California
BBC Monthey players
BC Spartak Primorye players
Bnei Hertzeliya basketball players
Cal State Northridge Matadors men's basketball players
Changwon LG Sakers players
Basketball Nymburk players
Point guards
Idaho Stampede players
Iowa Energy players
Lugano Tigers players
Nigerian expatriate sportspeople in Switzerland
Nigerian men's basketball players
Shooting guards
Sichuan Blue Whales players
Sportspeople from Pomona, California
UC Irvine Anteaters men's basketball players
Wellington Saints players
Sagesse SC basketball players
Taoyuan Leopards players
T1 League imports
T1 League All-Stars